KVOK was a Full Service and Country formatted broadcast radio station licensed to Kodiak, Alaska, serving Kodiak Island.  The station was last owned and operated by Kodiak Island Broadcasting Company, Inc.

KVOK was taken silent May 7, 2019, after losing its transmitter site which was leased from the United States Coast Guard. On May 7, 2020, the KVOK license was surrendered to the Federal Communications Commission. Since the FM translator was now being fed by an HD Radio subchannel of KRXX (which became KVOK-FM at the same time), the country format remained on 98.7 FM.

References

External links
FCC Station Search Details: DKVOK (Facility ID: 12185)
FCC History Cards for KVOK (covering 1970-1980)

VOK
Country radio stations in the United States
2020 disestablishments in Alaska
Defunct radio stations in the United States
Radio stations disestablished in 2020
Radio stations established in 1974
1974 establishments in Alaska
VOK (AM)